Mount Morris Township may refer to:

 Mount Morris Township, Ogle County, Illinois
 Mount Morris Township, Michigan
 Mount Morris Township, Morrison County, Minnesota

See also 

 Morris Township (disambiguation)

Township name disambiguation pages